The Income and Corporation Taxes Act 1970 was an Act of Parliament passed by the Parliament of the United Kingdom which was repealed in 1992.

Section 226 plans
Under section 226 of this act, retirement annuity plans were first introduced to give self-employed people the right to contribute to a pension.

These plans were often known as section 226 plans even when the legislation was superseded.

See also
 Pensions in the United Kingdom
 List of Acts of Parliament of the United Kingdom Parliament, 1960-1979

United Kingdom Acts of Parliament 1970
Tax legislation in the United Kingdom
Repealed United Kingdom Acts of Parliament
Income tax in the United Kingdom